The Bashkim Sulejmani Stadium is a multi-purpose stadium in Kuçovë, Albania.  It is currently used mostly for football matches and is the home ground of Naftëtari.  The stadium holds 5,000 spectators  It is named after Bashkim Sulejmani, a hero of the city.

References 

Naftëtari Kuçovë
Football venues in Albania
Multi-purpose stadiums in Albania
Buildings and structures in Kuçovë